Ambah is a city and a municipality in Morena district  in the state of Madhya Pradesh, India. It is the administrative headquarter of Ambah-Porsa Block. It was formerly known as Ambrish Nagari. Kamlesh jatav (SC) of the BJP party is the present MLA from Ambah-Porsa Constituency.

Geography
It has an average elevation of 161 metres (528 feet). This area is located near the Chambal Ghat. River Chambal flows very near to Ambah and forms the border between M.P. and U.P. and M.P. and Rajasthan. It is famous for its ancient fort and Kakanmath temple.

Ambah lies on State Highway no. 2 of Madhya Pradesh. It is approximately at the midpoint of Bhind and Morena, two major district centers of Madhya Pradesh.

Demographics

As of the 2011 Census of India, Ambah has a population of 258,689. Males constitute 54% of the population and females 46%. Ambah has an average literacy rate of 64%, lower than the national average of 73%; with 72% of the males and 54% of females literate. Ambah is part of Tanwarghar and Tomar Rajputs having significant population of Brahmins and Gurjars also.

Schools and colleges

Ambah has several primary, secondary, and higher secondary schools. Almost 200+ schools.

Ambah Post Graduate College
Ambah Post Graduate College was established in 1959 as the first academic institution of higher learning in the town. It was given autonomous status in 1989 by the University Grants Commission (UGC) and is approved by the state government and the Jiwaji University, Gwalior in recognition of its performance and its potential. Since its establishment, the college has played a vital role in providing quality education in the town and the adjacent villages.

Shri TekChand Jain Higher Secondary School
Shri Tekchand Jain Higher Secondary School was established in 1950 as the first academic institution which provides best education in the city. It is affiliated to C.B.S.E. and Board of Secondary Education, Madhya Pradesh. Its motive is to provide the best education . It is also recognised by Madhya Pradesh board. In 2019–20 director is Anshul Jinesh Jain and owner Viraat Rahul Jain.

Religious status
Ambah is primarily a Hindu-dominant town. Rajputs are prominent in this area along with other castes.  There are hundreds of places of religious importance (mostly Hindu temples and a couple of mosques) in and around Ambah. There are five Jain temples in Ambah.

Transport 

The only mode of transport to Ambah is by road. The closest railway station is Morena which is around 33 km from Ambah. There is frequent public transport (mostly private buses/UVs) available between Ambah and Morena. The most prominent city close to Ambah is Gwalior (68 km). Ambah has a distance of around 300 km from New Delhi and the Agra is 120 km away. Means of transport are improving day by day. An open window reservation office has been opened in Ambah so that reservations for trains can be made.

Health facilities 

Ambah Civil Hospital is a large hospital in Morena district. Routine camps and vaccine camps are organized throughout the year. There are several private hospitals in Ambah.

Every year an Eye Operation Camp is also organized by Red Cross with the help of a local NGO.

Fairs and activities 
During February and March every year, an animal fair is organized by the local municipality. The fair starts about three weeks prior to Holi and lasts two weeks. 

This fair is known as Jayeshwar Mahadev Mela (in the name of an ancient Lord Shiva temple). The fair usually starts around three weeks before Holi and ends on the previous evening of the festival. The fair is a convergence of all the rural cultures prevailing villages and towns around Ambah. The major plays and drama skits are conducted in the regional language and by regional artists.

Other
Ambah is the hometown of Pandit Ramprasad Bismil, a freedom fighter and birthplace of Paan Singh Tomar, a well-known Indian soldier, athlete, and baaghi (rebel) and Narayan Singh Rathore a well known kachi.

Association of Charmanvati Geographers, Ambah (M.P.), publishes the research journal Charmanvati.

References

External links
 http://www.ambahpgcollege.org

Cities and towns in Morena district
Morena